Berko may refer to:

Berko d.o.o., a Serbian agriculture machinery manufacturer
95179 Berkó, an asteroid
Berkhamsted, a town in Hertfordshire, UK

People
Jean Berko Gleason a Boston University psycholinguist
Yaw Berko, a Ghanaian football player
Mikki Osei Berko, a Ghanaian actor
Berko (France Berčič), a Slovenian artist